Sailor was a major BBC television documentary series, first shown in 1976, about life on board the fourth HMS Ark Royal, a British aircraft carrier. It followed the ship on a five-and-a-half-month deployment to North America in 1976.

The series was filmed after the completion of a major refit and coincided with the 21st anniversary of her commissioning. It is particularly noteworthy for its depiction of fixed-wing aircraft operation in the Royal Navy before its demise in 1978, with the paying off and scrapping of Ark Royal. It shows the Phantom, Buccaneer, Gannet, Sea King and Wessex air group from 809 Naval Air Squadron, 824 Naval Air Squadron, 849 Naval Air Squadron and 892 Naval Air Squadron.

Series

Episodes

Appearances
Captain Wilfred Graham, who later became Flag Officer, Portsmouth (FOP) (now obsolete), is the Ark Royal's commanding officer during its deployment. Commander David Cowling, who features heavily in the series, was the executive officer. Other members of the ship's crew to feature quite prominently were a Leading Hand named Leading Airman (Aircraft Handler) Sandy Powell (who was shown getting into trouble for not displaying the required level of responsibility), Fleet Master-at-Arms Tom Wilkinson and the Ship's Padre.

Aftermath 
The series won Best Factual Series at the 1977 British Academy Awards, while episode 3 won Best Factual Programme and was repeated. The whole series was then repeated from 17 June to 19 August 1978, and again from 11 January to 21 March 1984. This second repeat was the conclusion to BBC Two's 'Fly on the Wall' season, and as with The Family, a follow-up programme was transmitted, in this case entitled Sailor: 8 Years On. Shown on 28 March, it featured updates on the lives of the crew members and also showed Ark Royal part-way through scrapping at Cairnryan near Stranraer, Scotland.

Soundtrack
The theme song for the original broadcast is the 1975 number one hit "Sailing" by Rod Stewart, which remains Stewart's biggest-selling single in the UK, with sales of over a million copies. However, the DVD release uses a different version due to copyright issues. Likewise "Shine On You Crazy Diamond" by Pink Floyd was used in the original TV version during sequences showing a live fire exercise featuring Phantom and Buccaneers at the Vieques weapons ranges in Puerto Rico. The DVD substitutes the Pink Floyd track for a smooth jazz composition.

See also 
 Carrier another similar documentary about the life on board USS Nimitz

References

BBC television documentaries
Documentary television series about aviation